The HJ-8 or Hongjian-8 and Baktar Shikan (Pakistani version) is a second generation tube-launched, optically tracked, wire-guided anti-tank missile system which was originally deployed by China's People's Liberation Army since the late 1980s.

Development 
In 1970, China's armored corps first proposed to develop a successor to HJ-73 and this was later approved, designated as the AFT-8 or HJ-8. The missile was jointly developed by Research Institute 203 and 282nd Factory, but the program was interrupted by political turmoil. The key designers were Wang Xingzhi (王兴治) and Zhao Jiazheng (赵家铮), who developed the missile. Development was not completed until the early 1980s, after the end of the Great Proletarian Cultural Revolution. After receiving state certification, the missile entered mass-production in 1984. HJ-8 is an optically tracked, wire guided ATGM. A series of upgraded variants have been developed since.

HJ-8 and its variants are manufactured by NORINCO's Factory 282 (Jiangnan Machine Factory—江南机器厂), Factory 5618 (Hunan South China Photoelectricity Instrument Plant—湖南华南光电仪器厂) of China and Khan Research Laboratories of Pakistan.

Design 
The HJ-8 series is China’s first indigenous anti-tank missile design and it can be considered an equivalent of the US BGM-71 TOW and Franco-German MILAN / Euromissile HOT anti-tank missiles. HJ-8 is a tube-launched, optically tracked and wire-guided missile system armed with a HEAT anti-tank warhead. The HJ-8 is a combination many experts believe of three Western antitank missile systems obtained from nations in the Middle East and Asia that were then examined and reverse engineered and modified: the tripod from the US BGM-71 TOW; the tracker-control unit from the French/German MILAN; and the missile from the UK Swingfire.

There are numerous improved models following the original HJ-8, designated HJ-8A to HJ-8H, each incorporating improved features over the previous model. HJ-8E entered service in mid-1990. The HJ-8E anti-tank missile weighs 24.5 kg, has a range of up to 4,000 m, and can also defeat explosive reactive armour (ERA). It can penetrate 800–1100 mm of RHA at 0° incidence / 180+ mm RHA at 68° incidence.

Designed to be both dependable and accurate, HJ-8 is now the standard anti-tank armament of the WZ-9, Mi-17, and Gazelle (replacing the original Euromissile HOT first carried) helicopter gunships of the PLA.

Turret launch platform 
A launching platform that can be installed on armoured fighting vehicles has been developed by Norinco for use as an HJ-8 launching platform, the SW-1 one-man turret. The all-steel welded SW-1 turret weighs 1,750 kg and can be installed on various tracked or wheeled vehicles. The turret is stated to be immune to 0.50 caliber armour-piercing rounds at close range (100 meters) and protection is further increased when add-on armour is installed. The turret can traverse 360 degrees and be elevated -40 to +60 degrees. The fire-control system, based on that of HJ-8H, is internally mounted.

The primary armament of SW-1 includes four HJ-8H ATGM, with two mounted in the rear location on each side of the turret. The secondary armament comprises a 30 mm main gun and a coaxial 0.30 caliber machine gun. A variety of ammo can be used and the maximum rate of fire of the main gun is around 6 rounds per second, and automatic fire can be selected at various rates. The 30-mm gun is claimed to be effective against ground targets up to 4 km away and aerial targets at 2 km, while the HJ-8H missile is effective against ground targets at ranges of 4 km away, and against low and slow aerial targets at the same range. A follow-on model that is remotely operated weighing 1.4 ton has completed its development and entered Chinese service, designed by the same designer, Wu Lixin (吴立辛). Like its predecessor, this unmanned model was also first tested by using HJ-73C ATGM. The unmanned version carries 160 rounds of 30 mm ammunition.

Combat use

Bosnia and Herzegovina
The Baktar-Shikan variant from Pakistan were supplied to Bosnian government forces in the early 1990s. Used by the Bosnian army forces against Serb tanks during the mid-1990s which helped the Bosniaks to destroy Serb tanks and helped in further combat.

Sri Lanka 
The Sri Lanka Army acquired HJ-8 from China, during the civil conflict against the separatist Liberation Tigers of Tamil Eelam (LTTE). They were mostly used to take out LTTE strucuture, including bunkers.

On at least one occasion, during the 2009 Battle of Mullaitivu the Army used these weapons against fast attack craft of the LTTE's Sea Tigers naval wing.

Syria 
Since June 2013, videos showing the use of the HJ-8 by Free Syrian Army rebels against Syrian Arab Army armor have surfaced and have been successful in destroying T-72 tanks.

Iraq 
Since December 2014, videos showing the use of the HJ-8 by the Peshmerga against Islamic State (ISIL) have surfaced. The HJ-8 systems might have been captured from ISIL stockpiles.

Pakistan
The Bhaktar Shikan variant of the HJ-8 made by Pakistan has been used in large numbers against  TTP insurgents during Operation Zarb-e-Azb where it was mainly used to destroy Hideouts and caves where the insurgents would usually hide.
The Pakistan army also uses the Bhaktar Shikan ATGM on the Line of Control where it has been mainly used as a Bunker Buster weapon. It has been used extensively against Indian Army Bunkers and Checkposts on the Line of Control during border skirmishes.

Variants 
Launchers:
 HJ-8 – The original version. Claimed to be able to achieve a kill probability of 90%
 HJ-8A – First upgrade of HJ-8 with greater penetration power, slightly larger than HJ-8, with range increased to 4 km.
 HJ-8B – A HJ-8 model specifically developed for helicopters, with greater penetration power and range increased to 5.3 km.
 HJ-8C – Specifically developed to defeat explosive reactive armour with a tandem-charge. From HJ-8C onward, all HJ-8 missiles can be carried by various platforms.
 HJ-8D – Upgraded variant with tandem charge.
 HJ-8E – Upgrade of HJ-8B/C with a new rocket motor with a range of up to 4 km, entered service in mid-1990. Fire-control system (FCS) is highly digitized and includes a thermal imaging system for all-weather day-night capability. The HJ-8E anti-tank missile weighs 24.5 kg, has a range of up to 4,000 m, can also defeat explosive reactive armour (ERA).
 HJ-8F – Variant with an anti bunker warhead.
 HJ-8FAE – Version featuring a thermobaric warhead.
 HJ-8L – A model with reduced overall weight, L meaning "light". Using feedback from the Bosnian War, HJ-8E was designed to meet the need of a lightweight ATGM that is just as capable as heavier models. HJ-8L can accommodate two missiles, one smaller with 3 km range and one larger with 4 km range. New microelectronics are used in the fire-control system and use of composite materials in the launching/storage system reduce weight to 22.5 kg, so that HJ-8L can be carried by a crew of two.
 HJ-8H – Upgraded HJ-8E; adopting the same fire-control system and lightweight launching/storage system of HJ-8L. Uses a new missile, capable of engaging ground targets 6 km away and low speed aerial targets such as helicopters 4 km away.
 HJ-8S – Variant with an anti ship warhead.
 Baktar-Shikan – Baktar-Shikan ( "Armour Piercing") is a variant of HJ-8 that has been manufactured under license by Pakistan at Khan Research Laboratories. The missile and launch system can be quickly disassembled into four sub-units, each weighing less than 25 kg, making the system crew-portable. Baktar-Shikan is also mounted on Pakistani  armoured personnel carriers (APCs) and a modified air-launched variant is used to arm the AH-1 Cobra helicopter gunships and other helicopters of the Pakistan Army Aviation wing. Pakistan also exports Baktar-Shikan. The export version is credited to destroy all currently known tank targets with a 90% hit and penetration probability at a distance of 3 km. Baktar-Shikan has been exported to Bangladesh and Malaysia. An indoor training simulator is also available with Baktar-Shikan. It is an exact replica of the weapon and is used to train operators by simulating various target speeds, ranges and angles. The target's movement parameters can be adapted to the progressive skill level of the operator under training. An optional laser aiming device is also under development to increase accuracy at longer ranges. According to SIPRI, between 1990 and 2020, Pakistan has produced 25,350 Baktar-Shikan missiles.
 HJ-11 (AFT-11): development of HJ-8 with semi-active laser guidance, received a new designation HJ-11 because it is claimed to be the third generation anti-tank missile by Chinese.
Mounted Platforms:
 BJ212 HJ-8: HJ-8 launcher mounted on a Beijing BJ212 as a mobile anti-tank platform.
 BJ2020 HJ-8E: HJ-8E launcher mounted on a Beijing BJ2020 as a mobile anti-tank platform.
 CSK-181 AFT-11 Carrier: AFT-11 (HJ-11) launcher mounted on a CSK-181 MRAP assault vehicle.

Operators 

 
  – Ordered in 2000, 114 delivered in 2001. 172 Baktar-Shikan variant delivered from Pakistan in 2004-2005.
 : 500 HJ-8s delivered to Bolivia in 2003.
 
 : 264
 
 
 : Peshmerga
 
 : 450 in inventory.
  – HJ-8L: 367
 : Produced locally under license as the Baktar-Shikan, according to SIPRI nearly 25000 produced till 2020 
 :
 
 : 310
  – Made under license as the Sarib by Military Industries Corporation. Some Chinese-made captured by Sudan People's Liberation Movement-North.
  – Different Syrian insurgent factions in the Syrian civil war. Externally supplied.

Non-State actors
 United Wa State Army

See also 
 Anti-tank guided missile
 Wire-guided missile
 SACLOS
Related development
 HJ-9
Similar weapons
 9K111 Fagot
 9M113 Konkurs
 BGM-71 TOW
 MILAN
 Karaok
Related lists
 List of anti-tank guided missiles
 List of missiles

References

External links 

 SinoDefence.com article on HJ-8

Cold War weapons of China
Anti-tank guided missiles of the People's Republic of China
China–Pakistan military relations
Guided missiles of Pakistan
Military equipment introduced in the 1980s
Norinco